Nichaphat Chatchaipholrat (born 17 September 1995), nicknamed Pearwah, is a Thai actress and singer who is known for her role as Kanompang in Hormones: The Series and Boyo in Friend Zone The Series and Friend Zone 2: Dangerous Area.

Early life and career
Chatchaipholrat was born on 17 September 1995 in Khon Kaen, Thailand. She joined the Hormones The Next Gen audition and she made it to the Top 12 and later became part of the Top 5. She debuted as an actress in the second season of Hormones: The Series as Kanompang in 2014. The same year she also acted in another series ThirTEEN Terrors.

In 2015, Chatchaipholrat reprised her role as Kanompang in the third season of Hormones: The Series. She also had a guest role in Stupid Cupid: The Series and the main role of Khaiwan in Lovey Dovey.

"Rak Tid Siren", a song she and Paris Intarakomalyasut sang as one of the official soundtrack for My Ambulance, was hailed as one of the "two biggest Thai songs" of 2019 and was featured in the "One Love Asia" fundraising event of UNICEF for those affected in Asia by COVID-19.

It was announced last February 19, 2021 via a Facebook post by Nadao Bangkok that Chatchaipholrat is leaving Nadao Music and Nadao Bangkok and would hence work as a freelance actress and singer.

On August 20, 2021 it was announced that she has joined High Cloud Entertainment as a solo artist. [7]

Filmography

Television

References

External links

1995 births
Living people
Nichaphat Chatchaipholrat
Nichaphat Chatchaipholrat
Nichaphat Chatchaipholrat
Nichaphat Chatchaipholrat
Nichaphat Chatchaipholrat